Bettina Cass  (born 1940) is an Australian sociologist and social policy adviser. As of 2020 she is emeritus professor at both the University of New South Wales and the University of Sydney. After retirement, she continued to coordinate the Higher Research Degree programme at the Social Policy Research Centre, UNSW.

Bettina Cass was born in Waverley, New South Wales, Australia, in 1940.

Cass was elected Fellow of the Academy of the Social Sciences in Australia in 1989. She was appointed Officer of the Order of Australia in the 1990 Australia Day Honours for "service to social security policy and women's affairs".

Cass was married to Dr Cecil Cass, with whom she had four children. Her daughter, Gina Cass-Gottlieb, was appointed chair of the Australian Competition & Consumer Commission in March 2022.

The Cass Review 
The major contribution of Cass to policy was the Social Security Review, instigated by Social Security Minister Brian Howe, which she directed from 1986 to 199. The Review was a model for many that came after it. It performed a wide ranging consultation and produced six background papers and a final report. The Review led to major changes in Australian social security programmes and operations, most of which have continued to the present. It made recommendations on family income support, sole parent family policy, unemployment policies, income support for illness and disability, and retirement incomes policy. Substantial revisions of programmes were undertaken by 1994, to which the review wholly or partially contributed.  

Longer term effects of the Review included  

 linking of unemployment benefits to work assistance measures such as training and job placement assistance
 guaranteed indexation of most payments to cost of living increases,
 ongoing monitoring and evaluation of programme outcomes, including a major evaluation every three to five years
 removal of gender-related eligibility for various payments
The main changes to individual payments were

 (1989) replacement of unemployment benefits with Jobsearch for under 17s, and Newstart for those unemployed for 12 months or more. and a far greater emphasis on work search efforts and requirements

Selected publications

References

External links 
 

1940 births
Living people
Academic staff of the University of New South Wales
Academic staff of the University of Sydney
Officers of the Order of Australia
Fellows of the Academy of the Social Sciences in Australia